World Open Karate Championship is the largest competition in Kyokushin Karate. This tournament is arranged every fourth year in Tokyo.

Rules 
All world open tournaments operate under knockdown karate rules which involve standup bareknuckle fighting with basically no protection. The more characteristical rules in knockdown karate compared to other styles are that you are not allowed to punch in the face and a point system that only counts hits that actually "hurt" the opponent. This makes knockdown fighting very physical but at the same time quite safe considering that there are very few hits to the head. There can be slight variances in the rules between the different organizations responsible for a tournaments although the basics are the same. The rules have also been modified over the years.

Normally knockdown rules include: 
 No protectors or guards are used, with the exception of groin guards and protection of the teeth.
 3 minutes match time
 The fighter that achieves an Ippon (one point) will win the match and the fight is stopped. An Ippon is achieved when an attack either knocks down the opponent for more than 3 seconds or renders the opponent reluctant to continue the fight. An ippon can also be granted if an illegal technique is used or the other fighter is disqualified.
 A fighter can also win the fight by Waza-ari (half point) which is awarded if the opponent is knocked down for less than 3 seconds and is able to continue the fight. If two Waza-aris are achieved during the fight by the same fighter it is counted as an Ippon and the fight is stopped. 
 If no knockdowns occur, the judges can declare one fighter as the winner by overall efficiency of techniques, force and spirit.
 In case of a draw there can be a maximum of 3 extensions (each 2 minutes long). Some tournaments will also settle draws by weight difference and the result of Tamaeshiwari (breaking of tiles)

Illegal techniques are
 Punches to the face
 Kicks to the groin
 Grappling, grabbing of any form
 Headbutts
 Kick to knee
 Kick to rear of head
 Pushing
 Strike to spine from rear
 Elbow to face

Read more about various full contact karate rules

Results

Before split of IKO 
Between 1975 and 1991, the World Open Tournament was organized by IKO (International Karate Organization Kyokushinkaikan), led by Mas Oyama. The event was held five times: 
 1st World Open Tournament (1–3 November 1975) with 128 competitors from 32 countries 
 2nd World Open Tournament (23–25 November 1979) with 187 competitors from 62 countries 
 3rd World Open Tournament (20–22 January 1984) with 192 competitors from 60 countries 
 4th World Open Tournament (6–8 November 1987) with 207 competitors from 77 countries
 5th World Open Tournament (2–4 November 1991) with 250 competitors from 105 countries

After the death of Mas Oyama in 1994, IKO split up into several factions. The World Open Tournament has continued to be held but organised in parallel by several organizations.

IKO1 (Matsui branch) 
From 1995, the World Open Tournament has been organized by IKO1 led by Shokei Matsui.
 6th World Open Tournament IKO1 (3–5 November 1995) with 168 competitors from 85 countries
 7th World Open Tournament IKO1 (5–7 November 1999) with 192 competitors from 86 countries
 8th World Open Tournament IKO1 (1–3 November 2003) with 240 competitors from 63 countries
 9th World Open Tournament IKO1 (16–18 November 2007) with 192 competitors from 65 countries
 10th World Open Tournament IKO1 (4–6 November 2011) with 192 competitors from 43 countries
 11th World Open Tournament IKO1 (20–22 November 2015) with 192 competitors from 46 countries
 12th World Open Tournament IKO1 (22–24 November 2019) with 164 competitors from 38 countries

WKO (Shinkyokushinkai) 
From 1996, the World Open Tournament has also been organized by WKO (World Karate Organization Shinkyokushinkai) led by Kenji Midori.
 6th World Open Tournament WKO (February 1996) with 172 competitors
 7th World Open Tournament WKO (5–6 December 1999) with 128 competitors from 53 countries
 8th World Open Tournament WKO (4–5 October 2003) with 128 competitors from 63 countries
 9th World Open Tournament WKO (13–14 October 2007) with 128 competitors
 10th World Open Tournament WKO (4–6 November 2011) with 129 competitors from 52 countries
 11th World Open Tournament WKO (31 October – 1 November 2015) with 164 competitors from 60 countries
 12th World Open Tournament WKO (9–10 November 2019) with 161 competitors from 71 countries

IKO3 (Matsushima branch) 

 6th World Open Tournament IKO3 - Not held, info needed?
 7th World Open Tournament IKO3 (25-26 November 2000, Tokyo, Japan)
 8th World Open Tournament IKO3 (27-28 November 2004, Isesaki City, Japan)
 9th World Open Tournament IKO3 (29-30 November 2008, Isesaki City, Japan)
 10th World Open Tournament IKO3 (23-24 June 2012, Tokyo, Japan)
 11th World Open Tournament IKO3 (26-27 November 2016, Maebashi, Japan)
 12th World Open Tournament IKO3 - to be held

Kyokushin Union (Rengokai) 

 1st World Open Tournament Rengōkai (18 January 2004, Shizuoka, Japan)
 2nd World Open Tournament Rengōkai (19–20 January, Japan, 2008) - held in weight categories
 3rd World Open Tournament Rengōkai (10–11 November, Toyama, Japan, 2012)
 4th World Open Tournament Rengōkai (20–21 January, Toyama, Japan, 2017)

They decided though to renumber the event starting with World Open Tournament 1. Also note that the second event in 2008 was organized in weight categories and is therefore not presented here.

So-Kyokushin (Ohishi branch) 
Results to be added

See also 
 Kyokushin World Cup in Weight Categories

References 

Karate competitions in Japan